The Warrior and the Wolf is a 2009 Chinese historical action film directed by Tian Zhuangzhuang. It tells the story of the battle between two ancient warriors. It is Tian's latest directorial effort since 2006's The Go Master.

Filming began in fall 2008 in China's northwest Xinjiang Autonomous Region. The film was released in late 2009.

The Warrior and the Wolf is being co-produced by companies from Hong Kong (Edko Films), Singapore (MediaCorp Raintree Pictures) and China (Perfect World Culture).

Plot 
General Zhang is the commander of a northern border's army camp which repels the attacking barbarians every year. When snowfall makes the support of the base with supplies impossible, the troops return home.

Lu Shenkang is a newly recruited soldier who was a shepherd, has no courage and tries to flee the army on several occasions. Lu bonds with General Zhang and when the barbarians attack and take him hostage, Lu exchanges him with a captured tribal prince.

The wounded General Zhang returns home earlier and Lu stays in charge.

When the winter's snow arrives, he leads his men on the trip home. Due to the harsh weather they take refuge in the Harran tribe's village where Lu takes a hut and  woman for himself.

Shortly before the soldiers leave the village to continue their return home, the woman tells Lu that legend says that being intimate with outsiders leads to them becoming wolves.

The army marches on and are attacked by wolves. A following sand storm kills all but Lu who returns to the village.

Years later the barbarians surrender to Imperial China and General Zhang returns to the region to deliver the court's messages.

Two of his men shoot at dogs and are found dead in the morning.

General Zhang is bitten to death by two wolves after riding out to a deserted fortification.

Cast 
 Maggie Q - woman of the Harran tribe; actress Maggie Q was cast in the lead role in September 2008 as a replacement for Tang Wei, who was originally to take the role. Due to Tang's role in Ang Lee's sexually explicit Lust, Caution, however, she was banned from acting in mainland productions by the State Administration of Radio, Film, and Television.
 Tou Chung-hua - General Zhang
 Joe Odagiri - Lu, a soldier who was a shepherd

Reception 
Critical reception was generally poor. Perry Lam writes in Muse Magazine, 'The original story is both a heartfelt tribute to physical love as a life force and an angry condemnation of the aggressive instincts of human beings... To transport the story to ancient China, and, through the novelty of casting, to have a Japanese actor play the role of a Chinese warrior and an American Vietnamese play a Chinese widow, is not to challenge the imagination but to impoverish it.'

References

External links 
 
 The Warrior and the Wolf from the Chinese Movie Database

2009 films
Films set in the Qin dynasty
2009 action films
2000s Mandarin-language films
Films based on short fiction
Films directed by Tian Zhuangzhuang
2000s romantic fantasy films
2000s historical films
Chinese historical romance films
Historical fantasy films